The Tartan Army are fans of the Scotland national football team. They have won awards from several organisations for their friendly behaviour and charitable work. They have also been criticised at times for aspects of their behaviour, however, such as indecent exhibitionism  and jeering at "God Save the Queen".

History 

Tartan is part of the symbolic national dress of Scotland, and the name Tartan Army first came into common usage in the 1970s, to describe the "well-refreshed hordes" who would stand on the terracings at Hampden Park, or biannually at Wembley for the England match. Scotland fans were criticised at that time for their hooliganism, particularly after they invaded the Wembley pitch and destroyed the goalposts after the 2–1 win against England in 1977.

Two years later, 349 arrests were made and a further 144 fans were ejected from Wembley Stadium during the 1979 British Home Championship match, mainly for drunk and disorderly behaviour and vandalism. The behaviour in that latter match prompted the Scottish Sports Minister Alex Fletcher to apologise to colleagues and led to the creation of the Scotland Travel Club.

The Scotland Travel Club was established in 1980 with the expressed purpose of encouraging responsible behaviour by fans. It has been suggested by Professor Eric Dunning that the improvement in behaviour arose mainly from a desire to look better than the English fans, who experienced significant problems with hooliganism during the 1980s and 1990s. The Tartan Army have won a number of awards for their vocal support and friendly nature.

The organisation of the Travel Club had an immediate impact, with the Scotland matches at the 1982 FIFA World Cup being played in a "family atmosphere". The Tartan Army were named as the best supporters during the 1992 European Championship and also received an award for their behaviour at the 1998 World Cup in France. BBC News described the Scotland fans as "one of the highlights" of that World Cup, noting their colourful appearance.

Matches against England, which used to be played on an annual basis as part of the British Home Championship, were eventually stopped after 1989 due to violence and organised hooliganism. Both matches that were played between the countries in November 1999 in qualification for UEFA Euro 2000 had associated problems. Strathclyde Police made 230 arrests in connection with the tie played at Hampden, while trouble at the second leg in Wembley resulted in 56 supporter injuries and 39 arrests. Police spokesmen downplayed the incidents after both games, however.

Comments after the first game indicated that the arrests were for minor public order offences and that the scale of violence witnessed was lower than a typical Friday evening in Glasgow. The Metropolitan Police adopted a "zero tolerance" approach for the second game, but the number of arrests were "comparatively small" and the "vast majority" of supporters were well behaved.

21st century
The Tartan Army were awarded a Fair Play prize by the Belgian Olympic Committee after a 2002 FIFA World Cup qualifier in Brussels. The fans had been praised by the mayor of Zagreb for their behaviour after a match against Croatia in the same competition.

In April 2002, during the joint bid by Scotland and Ireland to host the UEFA Euro 2008 tournament, First Minister of Scotland Jack McConnell cited the "worldwide reputation" of the Tartan Army as a strength of the bid, stating that other countries welcome their arrival "with open arms". In 2005, the Scotland Travel Club became the Scotland Supporters Club, with sections for younger fans being established. Membership had grown to 17,000 by this time. The UEFA Euro 2008 qualifying campaign saw membership numbers increase dramatically to a capacity of 27,500, with a waiting list of over 10,000.

The Scotland Supporters Club is operated by the Scottish Football Association, with membership guaranteeing one match ticket for all home fixtures and offering the opportunity to apply for away match tickets. As of August 2010, the club is at its maximum capacity of 35,000 members and therefore does not accept applications.

In August 2008, Irish Football Association chief executive Howard Wells criticised jeering from Scottish supporters during the British National Anthem, "God Save the Queen", before a friendly international match against Northern Ireland. The SFA, who had pleaded with fans not to jeer the anthem, admitted that they were also "disappointed" by the booing.

The Scottish Government also criticised the Tartan Army, commenting that it had "tarnished" their reputation. Scotland were not punished for the booing because the match was a friendly, which fell outside the jurisdiction of UEFA. "God Save the Queen" was previously used as the Scottish team's anthem, but it was replaced during the 1970s due to consistent booing at matches. "Scotland the Brave" was initially used as a replacement, with "Flower of Scotland" being commonly used since 1990.

This issue recurred when Scotland played Liechtenstein in September 2010, as their national anthem uses the same tune as "God Save the Queen". SFA acting chief executive George Peat publicly apologised for a section of the fans jeering the anthem. It was again booed when Scotland played Northern Ireland in the 2011 Nations Cup. The Tartan Army has been a consistent opponent of the concept of a Great Britain team, particularly its participation in the 2012 Olympic Games, due to concerns that such participation would endanger the separate status of Scotland within international football.

Scotland qualified for UEFA Euro 2020, their first major finals since the 1998 World Cup. The tournament was spread around Europe, meaning that two of three group stage games were played at Hampden Park, but over 20,000 Scotland fans travelled to London for the game against England. This was despite Scotland only being allocated 2,600 tickets, due to COVID-19 restrictions.

Composition 
Research carried out in 1996 noted that the proportion of the Tartan Army comprising Rangers supporters, "traditionally the backbone of the Tartan Army", had declined since the 1980s. However, Rangers still provided the single largest proportion with 21%, while west-of-Scotland Catholics, traditionally associated with Celtic, were still notably under-represented. Politically, the Scottish National Party enjoyed the support of almost two in five Tartan Army members.

Charitable work 
The Tartan Army received a nomination in the inaugural International Scot Award, as part of The Herald newspaper's Scottish Politician of the Year ceremony, for their charitable work. The Tartan Army Children's Charity (TACC) and Tartan Army Sunshine Appeal (TASA) are both registered Scottish charities run by Scotland fans, raising money for disadvantaged children in Scotland and in the countries visited by fans following the team.

The Sunshine Appeal was first launched after Scotland's away fixture against Bosnia-Herzegovina in Sarajevo in September 1999 during UEFA Euro 2000 qualifying, when a group of Scotland fans, who had traveled despite the Foreign Commonwealth Office discouraging travel in the wake of the Bosnian War, were introduced to Kemal Karic, a local boy who had lost his leg in the shelling of Sarajevo. TASA's aim is to make a donation in every country where Scotland play a game, which they have done since 2003.

TACC has donated funds to projects for disabled and blind children in Ukraine, Georgia and North Macedonia. In 2009, £30,000 was donated to each of two projects in South Africa, where the Tartan Army had hoped to visit for the 2010 FIFA World Cup. The TACC, which is the nominated charity of the SFA, also organise trips for disadvantaged Scottish children to watch Scotland play at Hampden Park. TACC's main fundraising events are a lottery monthly lottery and the TACC Kiltwalk, an annual 26-mile sponsored walk from Hampden Park to Loch Lomond.

Music 

In 2007, the Tartan Army joined Scottish folk-rock band Runrig to record a version of Loch Lomond, christened the Hampden Remix, for BBC Children in Need. The song peaked at #9 on the UK Singles Chart and at #1 in Scotland. in April 2022, their recording was certified silver by the British Phonographic Industry (BPI) for sales and streams exceeding 200,000 units.

Official tartan 

Prior to the 1998 FIFA World Cup, Ian and Alan Adie, two Glasgow businessman, trademarked the name "Tartan Army" in 1997.   They approached the Scottish Tartans Authority to assist in creating a tartan.   Keith Lumsden designed the corporate tartan on their behalf and it was registered on 1 March 1997 under number 2389 with both the Scottish Tartans Authority (STA) and the Scottish Tartans World Register (STWR).

It is mostly Balmoral Blue  and Torea Bay , with Freedom Red , Gainsboro White , and Golden Poppy .

The Scottish Tartans Society notes that the design was taken originally from Royal Stewart and modified having Black Watch added as a background. It was first seen in common use at the 1998 FIFA World Cup.

Away with the Tartan Army – Scotland's Best Moments

In June 2021, the BBC produced a documentary hosted by Off the Ball'''s Stuart Cosgrove and Tam Cowan counting down the top 10 great Scotland supporting memories ranked by a group of journalists, pundits and former players and including interviews with Tartan Army members.

 Ally's Tartan Army – 1978 FIFA World Cup in Argentina
 Turf And Goalposts – 1977 British Home Championship vs. England at Wembley, which included the pitch invasion
 We'll Always Have Paris – UEFA Euro 2008 qualifying vs. France at the Parc des Princes, remembered for James McFadden's long-range winner
 The Greatest Show on Earth – Opening the 1998 FIFA World Cup vs. Brazil at the Stade de France
 Six Minutes of Insanity – 2018 FIFA World Cup qualifying vs. England at Hampden Park ending with late goals from Leigh Griffiths twice from free kicks and Harry Kane
 Ciao Bella – 1990 FIFA World Cup in Italy
 An Army of Peace – UEFA Euro 2000 qualifying vs. Bosnia-Herzegovina in Sarajevo, which led to the creation of TASA and TACC after the Tartan Army collected donations for those affected by the Bosnian War
 The Swedest Thing – UEFA Euro 1992, where the Tartan Army were named as the best group of supporters
 One team in Tallinn – 1998 FIFA World Cup qualifying vs. Estonia, which was abandoned after three seconds after Estonia did not appear for the match but included an impromptu match between the Tartan Army and Estonian security guards, which the Tartan Army claims to have won 1-0
 We'll Be Coming Down The Road'' – UEFA Euro 1996 vs. England at Wembley including Paul Gascoigne's famous goal

As a finale, the programme included reactions to Scotland's victory on penalties against Serbia in Belgrade to qualify for UEFA Euro 2020, their first major tournament since 1998, which was played behind closed doors due to the COVID-19 (Coronavirus) pandemic.

See also
 Ally's Tartan Army
 Football in Scotland
Tartan Army Sunshine Appeal

References

Association football supporters' associations
Scotland national football team